This is a list of electricity-generating power stations in the U.S. state of Missouri. In 2020, Missouri had a total summer capacity of 21,994 MW through all of its power plants, and a net generation of 72,568 GWh. The corresponding electrical energy generation mix was 71.1% coal, 11.7% nuclear, 9.8% natural gas, 3.7% wind, 3.3% hydroelectric, 0.2% biomass, 0.1% solar, and 0.1% petroleum.

According to the U.S. Energy Information Administration, the following were the top ten plants in Missouri in 2014 by amount of power produced:

The Missouri Department of Natural Resources reports that the state additionally has 9 pumped-storage hydroelectricity facilities and 20 conventional hydroelectric plants; the latter including the Bagnell Dam on the Osage River, which has a capacity of 176 MW, and the Table Rock Dam on the White River, close to Branson.

In 2014, Missouri's largest solar farm was located in Greene County, on a 57-acre plot owned by City Utilities, and is operated by Strata Solar. It generates a mean of 4.95 MW that contribute to City Utilities' transmission grid.  Since 2017, the largest solar farm in Missouri is the Nixa Solar Farm and is owned by Gardner Capital and operated by MC Power Companies. It is located on 72 acres and can generate up to 7.92 MW for Nixa Utilities.  In 2018 it supplied Nixa with about 9% of its energy needs.

According to the Sierra Club, there were as of 2016 a total of 16 coal-fired power plants in Missouri, a decrease from 2012, when there were 23. A Missouri City coal-fired power plant operated by Independence Power & Light closed in 2015; the facility was aging (60 year old) and could not comply with U.S. Environmental Protection Agency pollution regulations. In January 2015, Kansas City Power & Light Co. announced plans to stop burning coal at three of its generating units at Montrose Station, one unit at Lake Road Station, and two units at Sibley Station. Coal burning would cease in phases (two units ceasing at the end of 2016, two at the end of 2019, and two at the end of 2021).

See also

List of power stations in the United States

References

Missouri
 
Power stations